Fifth Third Center is a high-rise office tower located in Downtown Dayton, Ohio. The building is 102 meters tall (336 ft) The most noteworthy tenant is Fifth Third Bank. The building was known as One Dayton Centre until Fifth Third Bank moved into the building in 2009.

About Fifth Third Center
The tower has the following amenities:

Located within the tower is a restaurant called Phebe's Cafe and a unique gift shop called Ohio Made Gifts (OMG). Along with a restaurant, there is Fifth Third Bank Downtown Branch, a Wright-Patt Credit Union and FedEx Office and Print Services. Now Foreclosed.

See also
List of tallest buildings in Dayton, Ohio

References

External links
 Fifth Third Center Website

Skyscraper office buildings in Dayton, Ohio

Office buildings completed in 1989